{{Infobox officeholder
|name           = Hari Vinayak Pataskar
|birthname      =
|image          = 
|imagesize      = 
|order          = 2nd
|office         = Governor of Madhya Pradesh
|1blankname     = Chief Minister 
|1namedata      = Kailash Nath KatjuBhagwantrao MandloiDwarka Prasad Mishra
|term_start     = 14 June 1957
|term_end       = 10 February 1965
|predecessor    = Pattabhi Sitaramayya
|successor      = K.C. Reddy
|office1        = Minister of Civil Aviation
|primeminister1 = Jawaharlal Nehru
|term_start1    = 7 December 1956
|term_end1      = 16 April 1957
|predecessor1   = Lal Bahadur Shastri
|successor1     = Lal Bahadur Shastri
|office2        = Member of the Constituent Assembly of India
|term_start2    = 9 December 1946
|term_end2      = 24 January 1950 
|birth_date     = 
|birth_place    = Indapur, Pune, Bombay Presidency, British India 
Hari Vinayak Pataskar was an Indian lawyer, former Vice-Chancellor of the University of Poona and politician who was a member of the Constituent Assembly of India and a former Governor of Madhya Pradesh.He was the longest serving Governor Of Madhya Pradesh. Tenure was of 7 Years,8 Months and of 10 Days In 1963, he was awarded the Padma Vibhushan, the second highest civilian honour in India, for services in Public Affairs.

References

External links
Bio on Raj Bhavan website

Governors of Madhya Pradesh
1892 births
1970 deaths
People from Pune district
20th-century Indian lawyers
Members of the Constituent Assembly of India
Prisoners and detainees of British India
Recipients of the Padma Vibhushan in public affairs
Indian independence activists from Maharashtra
Law Ministers of India
Civil aviation ministers of India
Members of the Cabinet of India
India MPs 1952–1957
India MPs 1957–1962
20th-century Indian educational theorists
Lok Sabha members from Maharashtra
Marathi politicians
Indian National Congress politicians from Madhya Pradesh
Indian National Congress politicians from Maharashtra